The Puget Sound Senior Baseball League (PSSBL) is a non-profit 501(c)7 adult baseball organization, which started in 1989 for adults (ages 18–70+) who wanted to play baseball. The league started in 1989 with only 4 teams. By 1999, the PSSBL grew to 29 teams. The league is affiliated with MSBL/MABL, the 75,000 member national organization which spearheaded the adult baseball movement in the 1980s.

League structure
The PSSBL has approximately 1,050 players forming 68 teams in 10 divisions.  The divisions are organized based on age and skill level, ranging from competitive to recreational.  2022 marks the PSSBL’s 33rd season of operation.  The divisions are named after mountains or mountain ranges, such as Cascade, Adams, Rocky, and Teton.

Regular season and tournament play
PSSBL games are played at baseball fields around the Seattle-Tacoma area, such as University of Washington's Husky Ballpark, Bellevue College, Bannerwood Park, Edmonds Community College, and more.  The season runs from early May to Labor Day with local playoffs scheduled in September.  Players and teams from the league also compete in regional and national tournaments, including the MSBL World Series.  The MSBL World Series takes place every fall at Major League Baseball facilities in the greater Phoenix metropolitan area.  A number of PSSBL teams have won national World Series championships over the years.  The most recent national champion is the Age 65 & Over Puget Sound Mariners.  The Mariners defeated Kansas City 10-4 at the Milwaukee Brewers Maryvale (Phoenix) complex in October, 2021.

Hall of Fame
The Puget Sound Senior Baseball League Hall of Fame was established in 2011 with the induction of ten members.  There are currently 65 inductees recognized for their contributions and play.  PSSBL President Tom Evans Krause was inducted into the MSBL National Hall of Fame in 2012, received the MSBL National Lifetime Achievement Award in 2016 and was named MSBL National Man of the Year in 2019.

See also
Amateur baseball in the United States
Men's Senior Baseball League

References

Amateur baseball in the United States
Sports leagues established in 1989
Baseball leagues in Washington (state)
1989 establishments in Washington (state)